Bernard Volz (born 30 July 1968) is a Canadian former swimmer. He competed in the men's 1500 metre freestyle at the 1984 Summer Olympics.

References

External links
 

1968 births
Living people
Canadian male freestyle swimmers
Olympic swimmers of Canada
Swimmers at the 1984 Summer Olympics
Sportspeople from North York
Swimmers from Toronto